Panitch is a surname. Notable people with the surname include:

 Alyssa Panitch, American biomedical engineer
 Leo Panitch (1945–2020), Canadian political scientist
 Sanford Panitch, American film industry executive